The Battle of Strangford Lough was fought in 877 between two groups of rival Vikings described by the Irish Annals as the "fair heathens" and the "dark heathens". The Annals of Ulster describe "Albann", a figure usually identified with Halfdan Ragnarsson, a leader of the Great Heathen Army, as king of the "dark heathens", and Cogad Gáedel re Gallaib identifies Bárid mac Ímair, King of Dublin as the leader of the "fair heathens". All accounts agree Halfdan was killed in the battle, and Cogad Gáedel re Gallaib adds that Bárid was wounded in it.

Background
Sometime in the 850s or 860s the three Viking brothers Ímar, Amlaíb Conung and Auisle began to rule as kings in Dublin. Ímar died in 873, Amlaíb in 874, and Auisle in 867; with Bárid, son of Ímar probably succeeding them as king. Some scholars have also suggested that Oistin, son of Amlaíb ruled with Bárid as co-king. According to some scholars Halfdan Ragnarsson was brother to Ímar, Amlaíb Conung and Auisle, and hence uncle to Bárid and Oistin. Halfdan is not described as ruling in Ireland like his brothers in any contemporary source, but he is instead described as one of the leaders of the Great Heathen Army which invaded the Anglo-Saxon kingdoms of England from 865 onwards. Halfdan is identified by some as a brother of the three kings of Dublin because in the Anglo-Saxon Chronicle he is described as the brother of another leader of the Great Heathen Army named Ívarr. This Ívarr is often considered the same as Ímar, primarily because Ímar is absent from Irish records during the period Ívarr is described as a leader of the Great Heathen Army. According to the later Norse sagas Halfdan was the son of the legendary Viking Ragnar Lodbrok, but the historicity of Ragnar is uncertain and the identification of Ragnar as the father of Halfdan is not to be relied upon.

The main historical sources for this period are the Norse sagas  and the Irish annals. Some of the annals, such as the Annals of Ulster are believed to be contemporary accounts, whereas the sagas were written down at dates much later than the events they describe and are considered far less reliable. A few of the annals such as the Fragmentary Annals of Ireland and the Annals of the Four Masters were also complied at later dates, in part from more contemporary material and in part from fragments of sagas. According to Downham: "apart from these additions [of saga fragments], Irish chronicles are considered by scholars to be largely accurate records, albeit partisan in their presentation of events".

Battle
The Annals of Ulster record a battle taking place in 877:

According to South "there is now general agreement that Halfdan [Ragnarson] is identical with Albann". Albann is mentioned only one in other time in the annals; in 875 he is named as the killer of Oistin mac Amlaíb, possible co-king of Dublin. Assuming Albann and Halfdan to be the same person, and assuming Halfdan to be the brother of Ímar, this makes Oistin's death nepoticide. Downham suggests this familial connection indicates a motive for the murder; it was part of a dynastic squabble for control of the kingdom. Downham also suggests the squabble continued until 877, of which the battle described by the Annals of Ulster was the culmination. The Cogad Gáedel re Gallaib expands on the Annals of Ulster account:

In this account Halfdan is to be identified with "Ragnall's son". However, this is problematic since in the Fragmentary Annals the name of Ímar, Amlaíb, and Auisle's father is Gofraid, not Ragnall. It is possible Ragnall is simply a rendering of Ragnar, meaning Ragnar Lodbrok, who is named  as Halfdan's father in the later (and more historically dubious) sagas.

Notes

References

Citations

Primary sources
 
 

 
  Accessed via Internet Archive.

Secondary sources
  Subscription or UK public library membership required.

External links
 CELT: Corpus of Electronic Texts at University College Cork. The Corpus of Electronic Texts includes the Annals of Ulster and the Four Masters, the Chronicon Scotorum and the Book of Leinster as well as Genealogies, and various Saints' Lives. Most are translated into English, or translations are in progress.

870s conflicts
Strangford
Military history of County Down
Viking Age in Ireland